Basketball at the 1995 Games of the Small States of Europe was held from 30 May to 3 June 1995 in Luxembourg.

Medal summary

Men's tournament

Group A

Group B

Final round

Fifth position game

Women's tournament

References

External links
Information at FIBA Archive

Small
1995 Games of the Small States of Europe
1995
Basketball in Luxembourg